An intermodal car is a type of rail vehicle, which may refer to:
 A car specifically designed for transporting intermodal containers
 A well car, capable of double-stacking intermodal containers
 A generic flatcar re-purposed for container transport
 A spine car

Intermodal containers